The subsolar point on a planet is the point at which its Sun is perceived to be directly overhead (at the zenith); that is, where the Sun's rays strike the planet exactly perpendicular to its surface. It can also mean the point closest to the sun on an astronomical object, even though the sun might not be visible.
 
To an observer on a planet with an orientation and rotation similar to those of Earth, the subsolar point will appear to move westward with a speed of 1600 km/h, completing one circuit around the globe each day, approximately moving along the equator. However, it will also move north and south between the tropics over the course of a year, so it is spiraling like a helix.

The subsolar point contacts the Tropic of Cancer on the June solstice and the Tropic of Capricorn on the December solstice. The subsolar point crosses the Equator on the March and September equinoxes.

Coordinates of the subsolar point

The subsolar point moves constantly on the surface of the Earth, but for any given time, its coordinates, or latitude and longitude, can be calculated as follows:

where 

 is the latitude of the subsolar point in degrees,
 is the longitude of the subsolar point in degrees, 
 is the declination of the Sun in degrees,
 is the Greenwich Mean Time or UTC, 
 is the equation of time in minutes.

Observation in specific locations 
 Qibla observation by shadows, when the subsolar point passes through the Ka'bah in Saudi Arabia, allowing the Muslim sacred direction to be found by observing shadows.
 When the point passes through Hawaii, which is the only U.S. state in which this happens, the event is known as Lahaina Noon.

References

External links
Day and Night World Map (shows location of subsolar point for any user-specified time)

Spherical astronomy
Earth
Astronomical coordinate systems